San Andreas (Spanish for "St. Andrew") is an unincorporated census-designated place and the county seat of Calaveras County, California.  The population was 2,783 at the 2010 census, up from 2,615 at the 2000 census.  Like most towns in the region, it was founded during the California Gold Rush. The town is located on State Route 49 and is registered as California Historical Landmark #252.

History

Settled by Mexican gold miners in 1848 and named after the Catholic parish St. Andrew, the town has been a noted mining camp since early days. It existed as a tent city for the first few years, and even included a tent church. A few miles outside of town is the Pioneer Cemetery, established in c. 1851.

In August 1982, a nugget of gold was found here and was sold to Wells Fargo & Co. for US $12,000. The gold from the initially discovered placers gave out after a few years, but the discovery of gold in an underground river channel in 1853 revitalized the camp and it soon became a town. Mining of the channels was lucrative enough for the town to completely rebuild after fires in 1858 and 1863. The gold discovered here contributed greatly to the success of the Union during the Civil War. 

In 1866, San Andreas became the seat of Calaveras County. It was said to be a rendezvous location for Joaquin Murrieta. Notorious highwayman Black Bart was tried here and sent to prison.

The post office was established in 1854.

Geography

Climate
San Andreas has a Mediterranean climate typical of the Sierra Nevada foothills. Winters are cool and wet with mild days, chilly nights, and substantial rainfall. Summers are hot and dry with very hot days, cool nights, and minimal rainfall. Due to the orographic effect, rainfall in all seasons is significantly greater than on the valley floor to the west.

Demographics

At the 2010 census San Andreas had a population of 2,783. The racial makeup of San Andreas was 2,453 (88.1%) White, 23 (0.8%) African American, 48 (1.7%) Native American, 28 (1.0%) Asian, 1 (0.0%) Pacific Islander, 83 (3.0%) from other races, and 147 (5.3%) from two or more races. Hispanic or Latino of any race were 255 people (9.2%).

The census reported that 2,595 people (93.2% of the population) lived in households, 21 (0.8%) lived in non-institutionalized group quarters, and 167 (6.0%) were institutionalized.

There were 1,146 households, 314 (27.4%) had children under the age of 18 living in them, 449 (39.2%) were opposite-sex married couples living together, 156 (13.6%) had a female householder with no husband present, 66 (5.8%) had a male householder with no wife present.  There were 91 (7.9%) unmarried opposite-sex partnerships, and 13 (1.1%) same-sex married couples or partnerships. 396 households (34.6%) were one person and 190 (16.6%) had someone living alone who was 65 or older. The average household size was 2.26.  There were 671 families (58.6% of households); the average family size was 2.84.

The age distribution was 585 people (21.0%) under the age of 18, 197 people (7.1%) aged 18 to 24, 589 people (21.2%) aged 25 to 44, 777 people (27.9%) aged 45 to 64, and 635 people (22.8%) who were 65 or older.  The median age was 45.7 years. For every 100 females, there were 88.6 males.  For every 100 females age 18 and over, there were 85.0 males.

There were 1,311 housing units at an average density of ,of which 1,146 were occupied, 632 (55.1%) by the owners and 514 (44.9%) by renters.  The homeowner vacancy rate was 1.9%; the rental vacancy rate was 13.3%.  1,404 people (50.4% of the population) lived in owner-occupied housing units and 1,191 people (42.8%) lived in rental housing units.

Politics

References

External links

Census-designated places in Calaveras County, California
California Historical Landmarks
County seats in California
Populated places established in 1848
Census-designated places in California